Korkyra (also Corcyra) was an ancient Greek city on the island of Corfu in the Ionian Sea that is adjacent to Epirus. It was a colony of Corinth that was founded in the Archaic period. According to Thucydides, the earliest recorded naval battle took place between Korkyra and Corinth, roughly 260 years before he was writing, and thus in the mid-7th century BC. He also writes that Korkyra was one of the three great naval powers in 5th-century BC Greece, along with Athens and Corinth.

The antagonism between Korkyra and its mother city, Corinth, appears to have been an old one. Quite apart from the naval battle that Thucydides mentions, Herodotus records a myth involving the tyrant of Corinth, Periander. Periander was estranged from his younger son, Lycophron, who believed that his father had killed his mother, Milissa. After failing to reconcile with Lycophron, he sent him to Korkyra, which was within Corinth's governance. In his old age, Periander sent for his son to come and rule over Corinthn and suggested that they would trade places and he would rule Korkyra while his son came to rule Corinth. To prevent that, the Korkyraeans killed Lycophron. In punishment, Periander captured 300 young men of Korkyra with the intention of castrating them. That is more likely to be a myth explaining the animosity between Corinth and Korkyra and justifying the use of the word tyrant for Periander's rule than an actual historical event.

Persian War
During the Persian War of 480 BC, Greek envoys were sent to Korkyra requesting aid. Korkyra enthusiastically promised ships and fitted out 60 of them, but they failed to arrive in time for the Battle of Salamis. Herodotus ascribes that to a desire among the Korkyraeans to remain neutral and thus not to support the losing side. The excuse given for failing to join the battle was unfavourable winds, but Herodotus says that had the Persians been victorious, the Korkyraeans would have claimed to have deliberately avoided the battle to gain favour from the invading Persians.

Peloponnesian War
Writing between 431 and 395 BC, Thucydides credited Korkyra's conflict with Corinth over their joint city Epidamnus as a significant cause of the Peloponnesian War. Korkyra, otherwise neutral as far as the two major powers, the Delian League and the Peloponnesian League, were concerned, appealed to Athens, the head of the Delian League, for assistance against Corinth, which belonged to the Peloponnesian League.

In 427 BC, during the Peloponnesian War, there was a revolution and civil war in Korkyra between the democrats, who wished to remain in an alliance with Athens, and the aristocrats, who claimed that they were being enslaved to Athens and wished to form an alliance with Corinth and Lacadaemon. After a period of violent skirmishes, the democrats won with the assistance of the Athenian navy and subsequently slaughtered those they suspected of being an enemy while the rest fled to the Greek mainland.

4th century BC
Around 375 BC, a Peloponnesian fleet, under the command of Mnesippus, attacked Korkyra. After the siege, the resident Korkyraeans, suffering from hunger, deserted, were sold as slaves or were later put to death by Mnesippus.

Hellenistic Period
During the Hellenistic Period, Korkyra changed hands several times. In 303 BC, after a vain siege by Cassander of Macedon, the island was occupied for a short time by Lacedaemonian General Cleonymus of Sparta and then regained its independence. Three years later, Cassander besieged it again, but his fleet was destroyed by an intervention of Agathocles of Syracuse. The tyrant of Syracuse added the island to his own domains and in 295 BC offered it as a dowry to his daughter Lanassa on her marriage to Pyrrhus, King of Epirus. When Lanassa left Pyrrhus in 291 BC, she tried to transfer Korkyra to her next husband, King Demetrius Poliorcetes of Macedon, but in 274 BC, Pyrrhus's son Ptolemy recovered Korkyra for his father.

Korkyra remained a member of the Epirote League until 255 BC, when it regained independence after the death of Alexander II, last King of Epirus. In 229 BC, after a Greek defeat in the naval Battle of Paxos, the city briefly suffered an occupation by Illyrians, under the command of Demetrius of Pharos. Polybius wrote on the background of the incident in that same year: "When the season for sailing had come, [Queen] Teuta sent out a larger fleet of [piratical] galleys than ever against the Greek shores, some of which sailed straight for Corcyra...." Another part of the fleet that had sailed for Epidamnius was repulsed went also "there, to the terror of the inhabitants, they disembarked and set about besieging the town... the Corcyreans... sent off envoys to the Achaean and Aetolian leagues, begging for instant help... ten decked ships of war belonging to the Achaeans were manned... fitted out in a few days, set sail for Corcyra in hopes of raising the siege." However, "the Illyrians obtained a reinforcement of seven decked ships from the Acarnanians" engaging off the island of Paxi. They bested the Achaeans, capturing four ships and sinking one; the remaining five ran back home. "The Illyrians, on the other hand, filled with self-confidence by their success, continued their siege of [Corcyra] in high spirits... while the Corcyreans, reduced to the despair of their safety by what had happened, after sustaining the siege for a short time longer, made terms with the Illyrians, consenting to receive a garrison, and with it Demetrius of Pharos."

The Roman Republic intervened almost immediately by sending one of the consuls to relieve the island. At the end of the First Illyrian War, Korkyra was declared a free city and transformed into a Roman protectorate, which de facto ended the independence of the polis. Around 189 BC it was governed by a Roman prefect, presumably nominated by the consuls, and in 148 BC, it was attached to the province of Macedonia.

See also
List of ancient Greek cities
List of cities in ancient Epirus

References

 
Corinthian colonies
Cities in ancient Epirus
Former populated places in Greece
Populated places in ancient Corcyra
History of Corfu (city)